Thompson Township is the name of some places in the U.S. state of Pennsylvania:

Thompson Township, Fulton County, Pennsylvania
Thompson Township, Susquehanna County, Pennsylvania

Pennsylvania township disambiguation pages